Jean Baptiste Pierre Eugène Elichagaray (3 September 1886 – 8 June 1987) was a French rower who competed in the men's eight event at the 1912 Summer Olympics in Stockholm. A member of the Société Nautique de Bayonne, he was eliminated in the opening heats alongside Jean Arné, Gabriel St. Laurent, Marius Lejeune, Louis Lafitte, Joseph Campot, Étienne Lesbats, Pierre Alvarez, and François Elichagaray. He was born and died in Bayonne, France.

See also
 List of centenarians (sportspeople)

References

1886 births
1987 deaths
French centenarians
French male rowers
Rowers at the 1912 Summer Olympics
Olympic rowers of France
Men centenarians